Nighthawking is the theft of archaeological artifacts from protected archaeological sites and areas under the cover of darkness, most commonly by members of the public with the use of a commercial metal detector.

Nighthawking and the law
Nighthawking breaks the law on a number of points:

Trespass: Nighthawking is often performed on private land where permission to survey and dig has been refused. Any disturbance with the land or dispersal of any substance makes it aggravated trespass which is more routinely prosecuted.
Digging on scheduled sites: Digging on any sites which are scheduled monuments without prior consent from the Secretary of State for Culture, Media and Sport is illegal.
Declaration of treasure: The Treasure Act 1996 requires all finds that are legally defined as treasure to be declared to a local coroner or the police within 14 days. Nighthawkers rarely declare their finds due to the method of acquisition. Breach of this law can result in a £5,000 fine, a term of imprisonment up to three months or both.
Theft: In Britain, ownership of finds on private lands, unless declared treasure, rests with the land owners.

Impact on metal detecting in the United Kingdom
Nighthawkers, being criminals, are distinct from law-abiding metal detectorists. Hobbyist groups as The National Council for Metal Detecting or the Federation of Independent Detectorists are not to be confused with such criminal activity. Furthermore, it has been claimed, but not proven, that nighthawkers use such groups as a method of obtaining information about archaeological sites. It has also been claimed that criminal gangs have been directed to archaeological sites by rogue archaeologists seeking a share of ill-gotten spoils.

Nighthawking and the Oxford Archaeology study

Nighthawking was the subject of a study undertaken by Oxford Archaeology and collectively funded by English Heritage, Cadw, Historic Scotland, National Museum, National Museum of Wales and the Portable Antiquities Scheme. The primary aim of the study "Nighthawks and Nighthawking: Damage to Archaeological Sites in the United Kingdom and Crown Dependencies caused by illegal searching and removal of antiquities", was to assess the level of damage caused by Nighthawking to British archaeological heritage and to study the adequacy of current law in dealing with Nighthawking. The review, determined an average of at least 1.5 incidents a month.
Other relevant bodies associated with the study are Archaeology Guernsey, Jersey Heritage Trust, Manx National Heritage, National Museums Scotland and the Northern Ireland Environment Agency.

See also
Operation Icarus - Police investigation into the organised theft and black market trade of religious and church artefacts in England and Wales

References 

Archaeological theft
Archaeology of the United Kingdom
Crime in the United Kingdom by type